Atak Lual Wol Tong (born 1 January 1990 in Aweil, Sudan) is a South Sudanese footballer, who plays as a forward for Sudanese club Simba FC (Juba).

International career 
He has made two senior appearances for South Sudan against Mozambique in the 2015 Africa Cup of Nations qualification. On 5 September 2015, Lual scored the winning goal in the first competitive victory in South Sudanese history.

International goals
Scores and results list  South Sudan's goal tally first.

Honours
With Al-Ahly Shendi

Champion = 1
• Sudan Cup

References

1990 births
Living people
People from Northern Bahr el Ghazal
South Sudanese footballers
South Sudan international footballers
Al-Ahly Shendi players
Association football midfielders
El Hilal SC El Obeid players